Ent-kaurenoic acid oxidase is an enzyme with systematic name ent-kaur-16-en-19-oate,NADPH:oxygen oxidoreductase (hydroxylating). This enzyme catalyses the following chemical reaction

 ent-kaur-16-en-19-oate + 3 NADPH + 3 H+ + 3 O2  gibberellin A12 + 3 NADP+ + 4 H2O (overall reaction)
(1a) ent-kaur-16-en-19-oate + NADPH + H+ + O2  ent-7alpha-hydroxykaur-16-en-19-oate + NADP+ + H2O
(1b) ent-7alpha-hydroxykaur-16-en-19-oate + NADPH + H+ + O2  gibberellin A12 aldehyde + NADP+ + 2 H2O
(1c) gibberellin A12 aldehyde + NADPH + H+ + O2  gibberellin A12 + NADP+ + H2O

Ent-kaurenoic acid oxidase requires cytochrome P450.

References

External links 
 

EC 1.14.13